"Goldfinger" is a song by Northern Irish band Ash, released from their debut studio album, 1977 (1996), on 15 April 1996. The song was written by Tim Wheeler and produced by Owen Morris. It was released as a single CD, a 7-inch vinyl (the limited-edition 7-inch comes with a golden glitter clear vinyl and an accompanying picture sleeve), and as a cassette.

B-sides
"Goldfinger" was released with three B-sides. The first B-side, "I Need Somebody", has a big band feel, and was written by Mark Hamilton while he was in hospital. "I Need Somebody" features on Ash's first B-sides collection, "Cosmic Debris".

The second B-side, "Sneaker", was originally titled "Easter Island" and was co-written by Mark Hamilton and Barry Peak of Backwater while Mark and Rick were involved in a side-project band called Sneaker.  Sneaker (the band) featured Rick McMurray on guitar, Mark Hamilton on bass, Barry Peak on guitar and vocals, and Shaun Robinson on drums.  "Easter Island" was only released on a compilation of Irish bands called Laugh Hard at the Absurdly Evil, and unlike Ash's version of the song, is slower and has clear vocals.  Shortly after, Ash took "Easter Island" and recorded it, giving it the title "Sneaker."  Ultimately, it is a fast-paced grunge song with roaring guitars and distorted vocals. It also appears on "Cosmic Debris".  It was played live occasionally during Ash's Trailer & 1977 tours.

The CD only track, "Get Ready" is a cover of the Smokey Robinson song and originally appeared on the fan-club release "Get Ready", released in December 1995.

Release and reception
"Goldfinger" was Ash's first UK top-10 hit ( 5) and sparked a reaction that helped their debut album get to No. 1 in the album charts.

The song is arguably one of their best known, and also appears on their hits collection "Intergalactic Sonic 7″s", as well as live versions that appear on "Tokyo Blitz" and "Live at the Wireless". The song has continually been responded to well over the years, as to many the song represents the heady-days of Brit-pop-Era Britain.

In 1996, Tim Wheeler was quoted as saying that "Goldfinger is the best song we've ever written, and the best words I've ever written".

Music video
The video for the track is quite straightforward, and the band were apparently unhappy with it due to a lack of their involvement. It features the band playing in a basement while black-and-white shots are cut to occasionally. The video was directed by Mike Brady.

Track listings
All tracks were written and composed by Tim Wheeler except where indicated.

UK and Australian CD single
 "Goldfinger"
 "I Need Somebody" 
 "Sneaker" 
 "Get Ready" 

UK cassette and limited-edition 7-inch single
 "Goldfinger"
 "I Need Somebody" 
 "Sneaker"

Charts

References

1996 songs
1996 singles
Ash (band) songs
Infectious Records singles
Reprise Records singles
Songs written by Tim Wheeler